Ayala Malchan-Katz (born 1949) is an Israeli Paralympic athlete. Between the years 1968-1988 she participated in six Paralympic competitions and won 12 medals, of which 4 were gold.

Life 
Katz fell ill at the age of three months with polio which affected her lower limbs. For nine years she was treated in a hospital in Jerusalem and at the age of nine she returned to her parents' home in Rosh HaAyin .

As part of her medical rehabilitation, she began competing in disabled sports and participated in swimming, fencing and wheelchair basketball competitions. 

Katz lives in Petah Tikva and is the head of the municipal framework of the national program "Accessible Community" which works to implement a law of equal rights for people with disabilities.

Career 
At the 1968 Summer Paralympics, she won a gold medal in Women's Wheelchair Basketball. and a bronze medal in Women's Novices Foil. She competed in Women's Shot Put C, Women's Discus Throw C, Women's Javelin C, Women's Novices 60 meters B, Women's Slalom B, Women's Club Throw C, and Women's 50 m Backstroke Class 3 incomplete.

At the 1972 Summer Paralympics, she competed in Women's 60 meters Wheelchair 3, Women's Slalom 3, and Women's 50 m Backstroke 3.

At the 1976 Summer Paralympics, she won a gold medal in Women's Foil Novice Team, and bronze medal in Women's Foil Individual 2-3.

At the 1980 Summer Paralympics, she won a silver medal in Women's Foil Team.

At the 1984 Summer Paralympics, she won a silver medal in women's wheelchair fencing foil team.

At the 1988 Summer Paralympics, she won a bronze medal in Women's Foil Team. She competed in Women's Wheelchair Basketball.

References 

1949 births
Living people
Sportspeople from Jerusalem
Paralympic athletes of Israel
Paralympic wheelchair basketball players of Israel
Paralympic wheelchair fencers of Israel
Athletes (track and field) at the 1968 Summer Paralympics
Athletes (track and field) at the 1972 Summer Paralympics
Wheelchair fencers at the 1968 Summer Paralympics
Wheelchair fencers at the 1976 Summer Paralympics
Wheelchair fencers at the 1980 Summer Paralympics
Israeli women's wheelchair basketball players
Wheelchair basketball players at the 1968 Summer Paralympics
Wheelchair basketball players at the 1988 Summer Paralympics
Paralympic gold medalists for Israel
Paralympic silver medalists for Israel
Paralympic bronze medalists for Israel
Medalists at the 1968 Summer Paralympics
Medalists at the 1976 Summer Paralympics
Medalists at the 1980 Summer Paralympics
Medalists at the 1988 Summer Paralympics